Micromeria chionistrae is a suberect to sprawling hairy-glandular subshrub up to 30 cm high. Flowers pink-purple, flowering June–November.

Habitat
It grows in crevices of igneous rocks at an altitude of 850–1550 m.

Distribution
Endemic to Cyprus and common in the Troödos Mountains: Stavros Psokas to Kykko, Mavri Gremmi (Paphos Forest). Ayia, Prodromos, Kryos Potamos, Kyparishia (Limassol Forest).

References

External links
 http://www.natureofcyprus.org/detailinfo.aspx?cid=5&recid=271&rowid=174&rowcount=4&pageindex=34&pagesize=5
 http://www.theplantlist.org/tpl1.1/record/kew-127149

chionistrae
Herbal tea
Endemic flora of Cyprus